Jay Karnes (born June 27, 1963) is an American actor, best known for his role as LAPD detective Holland "Dutch" Wagenbach on the FX television series The Shield, Agent Josh Kohn on Sons of Anarchy (2008) and Craig on The Crossing (2018).

Early life and education
Karnes was born in Omaha, Nebraska in 1963. He attended the University of Kansas, in the class of 1989.

Career
In the mid-1990s, Karnes was a company member with the Oregon Shakespeare Festival, playing major roles in such plays as Love's Labours Lost and Tom Stoppard's Arcadia.  Karnes also starred in the films The Joyriders (1999) and The Next Best Thing (2000).

From 2002 to 2008, Karnes portrayed Detective Holland "Dutch" Wagenbach on The Shield.

In 2008, Karnes played the recurring role of ATF Agent Josh Kohn on FX Network's series Sons of Anarchy, created by writer/actor Kurt Sutter of The Shield. Kohn was an antagonist to SAMCRO's vice president Jax Teller and his sometime girlfriend Tara Knowles.  That same year, Karnes also appeared in the films Chasing 3000 and Broken Angel.

Karnes was featured in season 2 of V (2009) and was set to appear as a main character in season 3.

From 2009 to 2010, Karnes had a recurring role on Burn Notice as Tyler Brennan, a sinister gunrunner with a predilection for kidnapping relatives of those he wishes to leverage.

In 2011, Karnes appeared in the Body of Proof episode "Hunting Party". In 2012, he played Secretary of Defense William Curry in a recurring role on ABC's Last Resort. In 2013, Karnes appeared in the pilot episode of Jeff Eastin's drama series Graceland, as Supervising Agent Gerry Silvo. In 2014, Karnes appeared in FOX's series, Gang Related, as Agent Carter of IAD, as well as in the film Jayhawkers, as the chancellor of the University of Kansas.

Throughout his acting career Karnes has made guest appearances on several TV shows, including Frasier, Judging Amy, Chicago Hope, Cold Case, Criminal Minds, The Pretender, Grimm, Star Trek: Voyager (as Lieutenant Ducane in the season 5 episode "Relativity"), House, Scandal, and Stalker.

Personal life
Karnes and his wife, actress Julia Campbell, have two children.

Filmography

Film

Television

References

External links

1963 births
Living people
American male television actors
American male film actors
Male actors from Omaha, Nebraska
American libertarians
University of Kansas alumni